"Horns of Consecration" is a term coined by Sir Arthur Evans for the symbol, ubiquitous in Minoan civilization, that is usually thought to represent the horns of the sacred bull.  Sir Arthur Evans concluded, after noting numerous examples in Minoan and Mycenaean contexts, that the Horns of Consecration were "a more or less conventionalised article of ritual furniture derived from the actual horns of the sacrificial oxen" 

The much-photographed porous limestone horns of consecration on the East Propyleia at Knossos (illustration, right) are restorations, but horns of consecration in stone or clay were placed on the roofs of buildings in Neopalatial Crete, or on tombs or shrines, probably as signs of sanctity of the structure. The symbol also appears on Minoan sealstones, often accompanied by double axes and bucrania, which are part of the iconography of Minoan bull sacrifice. Horns of consecration are among the cultic images painted on the  Minoan coffins called larnakes, sometimes in isolation; they may have flowers between the horns, or the labrys.  It is generally agreed to be something to do with Minoan religion.

Sites
Minoan sites where the horns have been found in some form include Archanes, Armeni, Kamilari, Knossos, Mount Juktas, Odigitria, and Tylissos.

Astronomy
A suggestion for a practical use for the large examples on the top of buildings, is that they were used as frames for sighting the movements of heavenly bodies, for example the constellation of Orion, which may have represented the "young god" of Minoan religion.

Comparisons
Evans compared the Horns of Consecration with the four "horns of the altar" of Hebrew ritual, and with the altar with a horned cult object depicted on the stele from Teima in northern Arabia, now conserved at the Louvre.

Notes

Minoan religion
Minoan art
Sacred bulls
Religious symbols